Kingdom: Legendary War is a television program that aired on Mnet beginning on April 1, 2021, and ending on June 3, 2021. It is known as the male counterpart of Queendom, and the sequel of Road to Kingdom. During the finale on June 3, 2021, Stray Kids won the program, finishing in 1st place.

Overview
The program is a battle behind six trending K-pop boy groups: BtoB, iKON, SF9, Ateez, The Boyz, Stray Kids.The program features 4 rounds of performances, with the final round being broadcast live.

The winner of the show will get a reality show specially for the winning boy group, plus a "Kingdom Week" special shows.

Promotion and broadcast 
A preliminary competition, titled Road to Kingdom, aired from April 30 to June 18, 2020. The Boyz won the competition, securing a spot in Kingdom. On December 6, through the 2020 Mnet Asian Music Awards, the first lineup for Kingdom was announced, and it consists of Road to Kingdoms winner The Boyz, alongside Stray Kids and Ateez.

On January 22, 2021, Mnet confirmed that the hosts of the show will be TVXQ. Six days after, the network confirmed that iKON, SF9, and BtoB would join the lineup.

On February 17, 2021, Mnet released the first trailer and announced a global live broadcast of the 100-second group introduction performances which is to be aired on February 23, 2021, via Mnet's YouTube channel.

On March 16, 2021, Mnet released performance posters and announced a special stage featuring members from each group that was shown during the March 18 episode of M Countdown.

The show was aired simulcast on Mnet Japan, AbemaTV in Japan and tvN Asia a day after the domestic broadcast.

The final episode aired live and was live streamed on Mnet's YouTube channel.

Cast

Hosts 
 TVXQ
Max Changmin
 U-Know Yunho

Contestants 
 BtoB
 iKON
 SF9
 The Boyz
 Stray Kids
 Ateez

Rules 

The overall final ranking of the show is based on the following criteria: 
 Self-evaluation points (25%)
 Experts' voting (25%)
 Global voting (40%)
 Performance video view count (10%)

Introduction Stage - 100 Seconds Performances
The six boy groups will each perform one of their hit songs (that have won 1st place in a music show) for a 100-second performance that will best express themselves.

Except for the final performing boy group, which is decided by prior voting by the groups themselves of who they expect will win first place in this introductory stage. The first performing boy group is decided by the latter boy group who will themselves be performing last. After the first boy group has performed, they will decide on the second performing boy group, and the second boy group that has performed will then decide on the third performing boy group. The process goes on until the final boy group and all performances have been completed.
The introduction performances will be streamed live through Mnet's YouTube channel on February 23, 2021. Voting via the Whosfan app for the round started after the live stream (from 20:15 (KST)) and closed on February 27, 2021, at 23:59 (KST). Viewers will vote for their top 3 performances.
The winning boy group for this round will get 1,000 points, plus the benefit of arranging the cue sheet for the next round of performances.

Round 1 - To The World
The six boy groups each perform one (or two) of their representative hit songs, which are rearranged and different from their usual stages of the song.

Voting via the Whosfan app for the round started from April 15 at 22:00 (KST) and closed on April 18 at 23:59 (KST). Viewers will vote for their top 3 performances.
Experts' votes come from 30 professional judges, and each judge will have 3 votes to cast.
For self-evaluation, each boy group will hold 3 votes, and will vote for other boy groups other than their own group.
The winning boy group for this round will get 20,000 points.

Round 2 - Re-born
The six boy groups will exchange songs, perform and rearrange them into different styles.

Voting via the Whosfan app for the round started from April 29 at 22:00 (KST) and closes on May 2 at 23:59 (KST). Viewers will vote for their top 3 performances.
Views will only be counted for the first three days after the full versions of performances are released on Mnet's official YouTube channel.

Round 3 - No Limit
The premise of "No Limit" is that there are no restrictions for the performances in this round. A total of 40,000 points will be awarded in this round.

This round will be divided into two parts. The first parts involves the six individual groups being sorted into two larger teams (selected by Ateez, the highest scoring team in the previous round in terms of the total points in experts' votes plus self-evaluation). Each large team then divides its members into three smaller units - a dance unit, a vocal unit, and a rap unit, based on each individual idol's specialty. The corresponding units in each group will go against each other over three rounds - dance, vocal, and rap. The winning group in each of the three rounds will earn 5,000 points, which will be evenly distributed. The awarding of points is solely based on which group won each round. A total of 15,000 points are up for grabs.

The second part will be back in individual groups, with a total of 25,000 points to be distributed, in the same way as the other rounds. However, for the idol group's self-evaluations, each group can only vote for two teams, instead of three in previous rounds.

 For Part 1 of this round, 33 special judges are invited to judge the performances and each will have 1 vote. The special judges include Super Junior members Shindong & Donghae, producer and CEO of Brand New Music Rhymer, idol hitmaker Shinsadong Tiger, music critic Kim Young-dae, song production team MonoTree, choreographer Lia Kim and idol group members of BDC, Weeekly, Tri.be and Mirae.

Final Round - Who Is The King
The six boy groups will each perform a newly produced song live on the final episode. The new songs will be released digitally on May 28, 2021, at 12:00 (KST).

Voting for this round includes live text votes for voters living in South Korea, and through Whosfan app for overseas fans.
Digitals rankings will be determined via Gaon Music Chart for South Korea, and via Apple Music for overseas, from the time of release to June 1, 2021.

Rounds

Discography

Kingdom <Re-Born> Part 1

Kingdom <No Limit>

Kingdom <Finale: Who Is the King?>

Chart performance

Ratings 

Controversy 

On March 29, 2021, controversy arose following the reports from industry representatives of an issue in the midst of recording performances during round one. Each group were notified the maximum budget for stage decoration would be ₩5 million won (approximately $4,416) per team. However, during the recording, agencies from group's who comparatively did not have an extravagant set and props that appeared to be far over the budget reportedly confronted the production team on the matter and questioned if it was due to CJ ENM investing in the other group's agency. According to the report, the production team countered by stating it was because the group's props were from their concert, but as the other groups have also had concerts with props that could've been used, their agencies continued to speak out.

In response, during the press conference held on April 1, CP Park Chan-wook stated: "I apologize that an issue was raised ahead of the show's premiere. But we did not have to halt the recording due to someone's complaint. There was also no favoritism towards a certain team. I hope that the six teams and their agencies were not harmed by this issue. For round two, we had discussions with each agency about the parts that were lacking in round one. We have all negotiated and agreed on a way to bring out each team's creatives well. Starting round three, with the conditions that all six teams have agreed on, we will make sure that there are no more issues like these."

Song Credits 

Names of performing members that have also contributed to the songwriting will be highlighted in bold. The information below is detailed according to the songwriting credits available on the respective full performance videos uploaded on Mnet's official YouTube channel.

Notes

References

External links 
  (in Korean)
 

2021 South Korean television series debuts
2021 South Korean television series endings
Korean-language television shows
Music competitions in South Korea
South Korean reality television series
South Korean music television shows
Mnet (TV channel) original programming
Reality music competition television series
K-pop television series